Charles Morton  (1855–1936) was a British racehorse trainer. He was Champion Trainer in 1908. He trained at Wantage, primarily for Jack Barnato Joel, and trained Derby winners for Joel with Sunstar in 1911 and Humorist in 1921.

References 

British racehorse trainers
1855 births
1936 deaths
People from Wantage